The Episcopal Diocese of Eastern Michigan is the Episcopal diocese in the northern two-thirds of the eastern half of the Lower Peninsula of Michigan, not including the greater Detroit area, which is in the Episcopal Diocese of Michigan.

The diocese is headquartered in Saginaw, Michigan. It is a relatively new diocese, having been spun off from the Episcopal Diocese of Michigan in 1994. There are 50 separate parishes operating within the diocese.

List of bishops

References

External links
Official web site of the Diocese of Eastern Michigan

Eastern Michigan, Episcopal Diocese of
Diocese of Eastern Michigan
Christian organizations established in 1994
Province 5 of the Episcopal Church (United States)